Pancho Gonzales and Frank Parker were the defending champions, but were ineligible to compete after turning professional.

John Bromwich and Adrian Quist defeated Geoff Brown and Bill Sidwell in the final, 7–5, 3–6, 6–3, 3–6, 6–2 to win the gentlemen's doubles tennis title at the 1950 Wimbledon Championship.

Seeds

  Gardnar Mulloy /  Bill Talbert (third round)
  John Bromwich /  Adrian Quist (champions)
  Jaroslav Drobný /  Eric Sturgess (semifinals)
  Geoff Brown /  Bill Sidwell (final)'

Draw

Finals

Top half

Section 1

Section 2

Bottom half

Section 3

Section 4

References

External links

Men's Doubles
Wimbledon Championship by year – Men's doubles